The Mersey Basin Campaign worked within the catchments of the River Mersey and the River Ribble, in the counties of Lancashire, Merseyside, Greater Manchester and Cheshire and in the High Peak area of Derbyshire in the UK. Its primary goal was to repair the damage done by industrialisation and to foster a modern and prosperous future, with an improved environment.

Mission
The campaign's mission was to:
Improve water quality so that all rivers, streams and waters in the Mersey and Ribble catchments are clean enough to support fish by 2010.
Encourage waterside regeneration
Actively engage the public, private, community and voluntary sectors in the process.

History
The Mersey Basin Campaign was established in 1985 in the wake of the Toxteth riots in Liverpool. Michael Heseltine, then Environment Minister in Margaret Thatcher's Conservative government, was the driving force behind its creation. He spoke of the River Mersey at the time as "an affront to the standards a civilised society should demand from its environment". It closed its doors on schedule at the end of its planned 25-year lifespan in 2010, leaving behind a river system that is cleaner now than at any time since the Industrial Revolution.

Organisation
The Mersey Basin Campaign was a partnership backed by the UK Government through the sponsorship of the Department for Communities and Local Government. It was also supported by businesses, local authorities and public agencies.

The campaign worked through two bodies: the Mersey Basin Business Foundation and the Healthy Waterways Trust. The Foundation was responsible for business and administrative tasks, as well as much of the campaign's finances, whilst the Healthy Waterways Trust is a charitable body whose main role was to administer the campaign's charitable funds. The campaign was overseen by its council, which had around 30 members drawn from various public and private sector partners. The Healthy Waterways Trust remains in existence following the end of the Campaign, and continues to advocate for improved water quality and waterside regeneration in the Northwest of England.

The Campaign's last Chair was Peter Batey, Lever Professor of Town and Regional Planning at the University of Liverpool, who served from 2004–2010.

Local action
The Mersey Basin Campaign worked with communities on local projects around the North West of England through a network of action partnerships.

Action Partnerships:

Action Bollin

Action Darwen Valley

Action Douglas and Yarrow

Action Etherow and Goyt

Action Glaze

Action Irk and Roch

Action Irwell

Action Manchester Waterways

Action Medlock and Tame

Action Mersey Estuary

Action Ribble Estuary

Action Rossendale Rivers

Action Upper Weaver

Action Weaver Valley

Action Wirral Rivers

Action Worsley Brooks

External links

From March 2010 until March 2015, an archive of information, resources and documents relating to the Campaign's work will be available at:
 Mersey Basin Campaign website

Basin Campaign, Mersey
Environment of Merseyside
Environment of Cheshire